Al-Azhar is a mosque founded in Cairo.

It may also refer to:

Al-Azhar Al Sharif, an Islamic scientific body and the largest religious institution in Egypt
Al-Azhar University, a university in Cairo associated with the mosque
Al-Azhar University – Gaza, an Islamic university in Gaza City, that follows Al-Azhar of Egypt
Al-Azhar Great Mosque, mosque in Jakarta, Indonesia
Al-Azhar Park, Cairo, Egypt
Grand Imam of al-Azhar

See also
 Azhar (disambiguation)
 Azhar (name)
 Azhari (name)